The Zangana tribe is a Kurdish tribe in Kermanshah province and some parts of Iraqi Kurdistan.
They speak a distinct dialect. However, in recent years they have linguistically assimilated into the language practice of Sorani speakers in the area in which they live.

The settlement patterns of the people have shifted since the late 1980s.  The Saddam Hussein regime relocated them in the Al-Anfal Campaign of 1988; also, in the course of the refugee dislocations of 1991 the Zangana people relocated.

Additional reference	
Cecil J. Edmonds, Kurds, Turks and Arabs: Politics, Travel and Research in North-Eastern Iraq, 1919-1925, London, 1957.

References

Kurdish tribes